The Central Community School District is rural public school district headquartered in Elkader, Iowa.

The district is entirely in Clayton County. In addition to Elkader, it serves Elkport, Garber, St. Olaf, and Volga. It also serves the unincorporated areas of Littleport and Mederville.
The school mascot is the Warrior, and the colors are red and black.

History
In 2015, the district proposed a $6.85 million bond that was voted down. Another attempt was made in 2016 for $6 million.

Schools
The district operates two schools in a single facility in Elkader:
 Central Elementary School
 Central Middle School/High School

Central High School

Athletics
The Warriors compete in the Upper Iowa Conference in the following sports:

Cross Country
Volleyball
Football
Basketball
Wrestling
Track and Field 
Golf 
Baseball 
Softball
 1969 State Champions

See also
List of school districts in Iowa
List of high schools in Iowa

References

External links
 Central Community School District

School districts in Iowa
Education in Clayton County, Iowa